Nieder-Isenburg (often called Lower Isenburg) was a small mediaeval County in northern Rhineland-Palatinate, Germany. It was located to the east of the town of Neuwied, due north of Vallendar.

Roughly speaking, territories of the Archbishops of Trier were located to the south, and territories of the Counts of Wied to the north.

Nieder-Isenburg emerged in 1218 as a partition of the County of Isenburg-Isenburg. Nieder-Isenburg was partitioned twice: between Isenburg-Grenzau, Isenburg-Neumagen and itself in 1502, and between Isenburg-Grenzau and Isenburg-Neumagen in 1503.

Following the death of Count Ernst of Isenburg in Brussels in 1664 without direct heir, the territories of Nieder-Isenburg were claimed back as a feudal tenure by the Archbishopric of Cologne, the Archbishopric of Trier and the core tenure of Isenburg and Grenzau by the Archbishopric of Fulda. The Fulda part was eventually passed on to the Counts of Walderdorff who had to share them with the Counts of Wied, at that stage a cadet branch of the Isenburgs, following a later agreement. Eventually the Walderdorff estates were distributed to the Nassovian state in the Napoleonic era.

Counts of Nieder-Isenburg (1218–1664)
 Theodoric I (1218–53)
 Theodoric II (1253–73)
 Salentin I (1273–1300)
 Salentin II (1300–34) with...
 Salentin III  (1319–70)
 Salentin IV (1370–1420)
 Salentin V (1420–58)
 Gerlach I (1458–90)
 Gerlach II (1488–1502) with...
 James (1486–1503)
 Heinrich,  5.1.1521/22-1553 
 Johann Heinrich, +aft 15.11.1565;
 Arnold, died 1577
 Anton, +Walhain 5.11.1548–1577
 Salentin VIII (1532–1610)
Salentin IX (1580–1619) ( 5.12.1619, Prague)
 Ernst (1584–1664)
reversion to Fulda, Cologne, and Trier.

States and territories established in 1218
Counties of the Holy Roman Empire
1210s establishments in the Holy Roman Empire
1218 establishments in Europe
1664 disestablishments in the Holy Roman Empire
House of Isenburg
Electoral Rhenish Circle